"Rotate" is a song by American East Coast hip hop duo Capone-N-Noreaga, released as the lead single from their third studio album Channel 10. The song features fellow American rappers Busta Rhymes and Ron Browz and was produced by the latter. It is Capone and Noreaga's first single together in nine years.

Music video
The music video was directed by Rik Cordero.

Remixes
"Rotate (Remix)" (feat. Ron Browz, Swizz Beatz, Busta Rhymes & Jadakiss)
"Rotate (Champion Hoodie Remix)" (feat. Ron Browz, Maino, Uncle Murda, Joell Ortiz, Charlie Hustle, Spliff Star, Hell Rell, D.O.E., Tru Life, Mike Beck & Max B)
"Rotate" (Freestyle by Cory Gunz)

Charts

References

2009 songs
2009 singles
Busta Rhymes songs
Ron Browz songs
Song recordings produced by Ron Browz
Capone-N-Noreaga songs
Songs written by Busta Rhymes
Songs written by Ron Browz
Songs written by N.O.R.E.